Richard Hoyt Crawford Jr. (born July 26, 1958) is an American former professional stock car racing driver and convicted sex offender. Crawford competed in the Craftsman Truck Series full-time from 1997 to 2009. He is the former promoter and manager of Mobile International Speedway.

Early career
Crawford began his racing career as a short-track racer in the southeastern United States. He won the 1989 running of the prestigious annual short track Snowball Derby race. He also won the track championship at Five Flags Speedway in 1981 and 1984, and won the championship at Mobile International Speedway in 1981, 1982, and 1984. After that, he moved to the Slim Jim All Pro Series, where he collected sixty-one top tens, and earned five victories. In 1993 and 1994, he attempted four Winston Cup Series races in the No. 84, but did not qualify for any of them.

Truck Series
In 1997, Crawford moved to the Craftsman Truck Series with his Circle Bar team. He qualified for every race, had ten top-tens, a top 5 at Texas Motor Speedway and finished 12th in the points. He was also runner-up to Kenny Irwin Jr. for the NASCAR Craftsman Truck Series Rookie of the Year. The next season, he picked up his first career win at Homestead-Miami Speedway. Unfortunately, the team struggled to find consistency, with only five top-ten finishes and he dropped to eighteenth in the standings. Crawford started 1999 with two consecutive top-tens, but only wound up fourteenth in the points, scoring ten top-tens and four top fives.

In 2001, Crawford finished 8th in points, his first top-ten points finish, he would earn sixteen top tens and ten top fives. The 2002 season would prove to be Crawford's most successful to date, although winless for the season he had 17 top-ten finishes, a career high 12 top five finishes, two poles (at Dover and Phoenix), and finished second in the standings only 46 points behind champion Mike Bliss. 2003 saw him grab his second victory, at the Florida Dodge Dealers 250, in a memorable three-wide race to finish line at Daytona International Speedway. He finished the season seventh in points with 16 top tens and 10 top fives.

In 2004 in his first race after a massive crash at Atlanta Motor Speedway, in which Tina Gordon and Hank Parker Jr. were also involved, he picked up a win at Martinsville Speedway. He would finish the season with 9 top tens and 4 top fives, and fell to 12th in points. Despite a win at Loudon in 2005, Crawford finished seventeenth in points, mainly due to missing the first race of his Truck career after suffering injuries, ironically while practicing for the Built Ford Tough 225. Boris Said, who was scheduled to be a guest on the Speed Channel's race coverage, was hired to drive the truck. While he wrecked later in the race, he returned to the booth to cover the rest of the race, as the late Neil Bonnett once did at Talladega Superspeedway in 1993 after taking a wild ride into the tri-oval. He did score two poles at Atlanta and Martinsville and had 11 top tens and 3 top fives.

For the 2006 season Crawford had five top-fives and thirteen top-ten finishes including a win on August 4 at O'Reilly Raceway Park, finishing 9th in the final standings, the win at O’Reilly was his final career victory. Rick had a consistent year in 2007 racking up 11 top 5 finishes, 18 top 10s and a near win at Mansfield Motorsports Park en route to a 5th place standing in the points championship. The eighteen top ten finishes would be a career high to date. In 2008 Crawford put together another solid season with thirteen top tens and seven top fives and a pole at Texas. He would end the season seventh in points. In 2009, now age 50, Crawford would again finish in the top ten in points at 10th.  He scored seven top tens and three top fives and would win the pole at Martinsville for the second time in his career.

Crawford would start the 2010 season with a great deal of uncertainty. Longtime sponsor Circle Bar Motel and RV Park would cut back their sponsorship of the team dramatically and Crawford stated that he was unsure how many races they would be able to run without a new sponsor.  He would run the first four races of the season with Circle Bar, scoring two top tens. However, prior to Kansas Crawford announced that he would not race for Circle Bar in the #14 truck and would instead race in the Ray Hackett Racing #76 truck with sponsorship from SUPERSEAL Construction Products. This would be the first race in his record 327 Camping World Truck Series starts that he would not be in the #14 and would not be racing under Circle Bar Racing. Crawford would qualify for that race 15th and finish 31st after an accident going for the lead. In August, Crawford would take yet another unfamiliar step in his career as he would join forces with Tagsby Racing to race in the EnjoyIllinois.com 225 at Chicagoland Speedway. This would be the first race in his career that he would race in a Chevrolet truck.  Crawford would earn his 3rd top ten finish in 6 races with an 8th-place finish in the race. He ran in two more races with Tagsby to close out the season.

Crawford attempted to race with Tagsby Racing and make his 12th consecutive start in the season opening race at Daytona in 2011, but failed to qualify. Before 2011, Crawford was one of only 3 drivers to compete in all Camping World Truck Series races at Daytona.

Crawford is a former manager and promoter of Mobile International Raceway, and attempted the 2012 season-opening race at Daytona with Tagsby Racing.
He would race with Mike Harmon Racing's 74 truck at Martinsville, finishing last. He would race two more races with Tagsby Racing in 2012 at Texas and Chicagoland, finishing 29th and 11th respectively. At Talladega later that year, he raced for BRG Motorsports. This was the first time he would race in a Toyota truck. In 2013, he attempted Daytona with MAKE Motorsports, but failed to qualify. After that, Crawford would stop racing for good.

Legacy 
He raced in 210 consecutive races before missing the 2005 Built Ford Tough 225 race at Kentucky due to injuries sustained from a hard crash in practice.  He had not missed a race since that date until failing to qualify at Daytona in February 2011.  Prior to 2011, Crawford was one of the few drivers in the history of the sport with more than 50 starts who has never raced in any major series in NASCAR other than the Truck Series. However, that statistic was ended in 2011, when Crawford made his Nationwide Series debut driving for Jennifer Jo Cobb Racing at Chicagoland Speedway. He would then race his second and last Nationwide Series race with Mike Harmon Racing at Bristol in 2012.

Post-racing career
In March 2011 Crawford entered a multi-year contract to be the promoter and manager at Mobile International Speedway, his home track, in Irvington (Mobile), Alabama.

In March 2014 it was announced that Crawford would serve as crew chief for Team Stange Racing and driver Maryeve Dufault in the ARCA Racing Series.

On March 1, 2018, Crawford was arrested in Florida; he was charged for "attempted enticement of a minor." He pled innocent and was released into the custody of his family until his trial. Crawford was convicted by a jury on August 30, 2018.  On November 26, 2018, Crawford was sentenced to 10 years and 10 months in federal prison.

Motorsports career results

NASCAR
(key) (Bold – Pole position awarded by qualifying time. Italics – Pole position earned by points standings or practice time. * – Most laps led.)

Winston Cup Series

Daytona 500

Nationwide Series

Camping World Truck Series

Whelen Euro Series - Elite 1

References

External links
 
 
 Rick Crawford at NASCAR.com

1958 births
Living people
Sportspeople from Mobile, Alabama
Racing drivers from Alabama
NASCAR drivers
American Speed Association drivers
American sportspeople convicted of crimes
American people convicted of child sexual abuse
Child sexual abuse in the United States